The hawk is a predatory bird.

Hawk or The Hawk may also refer to:

People
 Hawk (nickname), a list of people
 Hawk (surname), a list of people
 Road Warrior Hawk, or Hawk, the ring name of Michael Hegstrand (1957–2003), American professional wrestler
 John Edward Hawkins (1969–2006), American rapper better known as "H.A.W.K." or "Big Hawk"
 Adolfas Ramanauskas (1918–1957), Lithuanian anti-Soviet partisan codenamed Vanagas (Hawk)
 Lee Reherman (1966–2016), "Hawk" on the TV show American Gladiators

Places 
 Hawk, Virginia, an unincorporated community
 Hawk Hill, California
 Hawk Mountain, in the Appalachian Mountains in Pennsylvania
 Hawk Woods, outside the city of Athens, Ohio
 The Hawk, Nova Scotia, Canada, a community

Arts, entertainment, and media

Fictional characters
 Hawk (birdman), a character from the second season of the series Buck Rogers in the 25th Century
 Hawk (G.I. Joe), a fictional character in the G.I. Joe universe
 Hawk, the titular character in Robert B. Parker's Spenser novels and the TV series A Man Called Hawk
 Hawk, half of the DC comic book superhero team of Hawk and Dove
 Hawk, the title character of the film Hudson Hawk, played by Bruce Willis
 Alonzo Hawk, a recurring villain in three Walt Disney movies
 Henery Hawk, a cartoon character
 Lieutenant Hawk, a character from the film Star Trek: First Contact
 T. Hawk, a character from Street Fighter
 Hawks (My Hero Academia), a character in the manga series My Hero Academia
 Deputy Tommy "Hawk" Hill, a character from the TV series Twin Peaks
 Eli "Hawk" Moskowitz, a character from the TV series Cobra Kai

Films
 The Hawk, a 1932 film starring John Wayne (US title Ride Him, Cowboy)
 The Hawk (1935 film), a 1935 American Western film 
 The Hawk (1993 film), starring Helen Mirren

Music
 Hawk (Isobel Campbell and Mark Lanegan album), 2010, or the title track
 Hawk (Big Hawk album), 2001
 "Hawk", a song by Bicep from their 2021 album Isles
 The Hawk (Ronnie Hawkins album), 1971

Periodicals
 The Hawk (newspaper), the weekly student newspaper of Saint Joseph's University
 The Hawk, a journal of the Royal Air Force

Radio station brand names
 CIGO-FM, in Port Hawkesbury, Nova Scotia, Canada
 CKDK-FM, in Woodstock, Ontario, Canada
 KHKK-FM, in Modesto, California
 WCHR-FM, in Manahawkin, New Jersey
 WHWK, in Binghamton, New York
 WODE-FM, in Easton, Pennsylvania

Other uses in arts, entertainment, and media
 Hawk (novel), a novel by Steven Brust
 Hawk (TV series), a 1966 American series starring Burt Reynolds
 Hawk Films, a British production company formed by Stanley Kubrick

Military 
 Curtiss Hawk (disambiguation), a series of aircraft
 BAE Systems Hawk, British advanced jet trainer
 Hawk MM-1, a model of grenade launcher
, two ships of the Royal Australian Navy
, several ships of the Royal Navy
 MIM-23 Hawk, an American surface-to-air missile
 Task Force Hawk, an ad hoc US Army unit formed during the 1999 unrest in Kosovo
, several ships of the U.S. Navy

Racehorses
 The Hawk (horse), a New Zealand Thoroughbred racehorse
 The Hawk, a racehorse that finished ninth in the 1841 Grand National

Transport 
 Hawk (cyclecar), built by the Hawk Cyclecar Company in 1914 in Detroit, Michigan
 CGS Hawk, ultralight aircraft designed in 1982
 Humber Hawk, a British car model
 Miles Hawk, monoplane designed in 1933
 Packard Hawk, an American car model
 Rolls-Royce Hawk, a British aero engine designed in 1915
 South Devon Railway Eagle class, also called Hawk, a 4-4-0ST steam locomotive
 Studebaker Golden Hawk, an American car model (1956–1958)
 Studebaker Gran Turismo Hawk, an American model of car (1962–1964)
 Studebaker Silver Hawk, an American car model (1957–1961)

Other uses 
 Hawk (plasterer's tool), a tool used to hold a plaster, mortar, or a similar material
 Deficit hawk, someone who favours reduction of government budget deficits
 HAWK beacon, or High-Intensity Activated crossWalK beacon, a traffic signal
 Hawk Model Company, a defunct US model kit manufacturer
 Hawk Stadium, baseball venue of the University of Maryland Eastern Shore
 Monetary hawk and dove, a monetary hawk favors low inflation in monetary policy
 The Hawk (Saint Joseph's University mascot), Pennsylvania, United States
 The Hawk wind, or Hawkins, a slang term for the wind in Chicago
 Tomahawk (axe), also referred to as a hawk, a type of Northern American single-handed axe
 War hawk, a term used in politics for someone favoring war

See also
 Black Hawk (disambiguation)
 Hawke (disambiguation)
 Hawkes
 Hawkins (disambiguation)
 Hawks (disambiguation)
 Sea Hawk (disambiguation)
 Starhawk (disambiguation)